Freedom Fight is a 2022 Indian Malayalam-language anthology film directed by a team of directors including Jeo Baby, Kunjila Mascillamani, Jithin Issac Thomas,  Akhil Anilkumar, Francies Louis. The cast includes Rajisha Vijayan, Joju George, Sidhartha Siva, Srindaa and others. The film was released on OTT, streamed through SonyLIV from 11 February 2022.

Short films

Reception 
Manoj Kumar R of The Indian Express gave the film 3.5 stars out of 5 and stated "All of the movies deal with some of the most important social problems of the country. And each of these films is narrated from the point of view of those who are less fortunate and who always end up getting a raw deal in the rigid power structure of our society."

Writing in Firstpost, Anna M. M. Vetticad stated, "The Great Indian Kitchen’s director presents a solid anthology with a glaring blemish." She later ranked it fourth in her year-end list of best Malayalam films.

References

External links 

 

Films directed by Jeo Baby